Valerio Zanone (22 January 1936 – 7 January 2016) was an Italian politician, who was formerly secretary and president of the Italian Liberal Party (Partito Liberale Italiano, PLI). He was also a senator for the Democratic Party (Partito Democratico, PD), and was mayor of Turin from 1990 to 1992.

Biography
Zanone was born in Turin. He graduated in philosophy from the University of Turin. After entering the Italian Liberal Party, he was a regional councillor in Piedmont, and was a member of the Italian Chamber of Deputies from 1976 to 1994. In the same year he was first elected as a deputy, Zanone was appointed as national secretary of the PLI, and was later president of the same.

In 1985, Zanone was appointed Minister of Ecology in the first Bettino Craxi cabinet, and was Minister of Industry during Craxi's second tenure (1986–87) and Minister of Defence in the Goria and De Mita cabinets (1987–89). He was mayor of Turin for a year and a half (1990–92).

After the Tangentopoli scandal and the dissolution of the PLI in 1993, Zanone formed a centre-left movement in Piedmont, the Liberal Democratic Union (Unione Liberaldemocratica; ULD). Later, he participated in the foundation of the L'Ulivo coalition, and adhered to The Daisy (La Margherita; DL) centre party.

External links
Page at Italian Senate website 

1936 births
2016 deaths
Politicians from Turin
Government ministers of Italy
Italian Liberal Party politicians
Democracy is Freedom – The Daisy politicians
Democratic Party (Italy) politicians
Alliance for Italy politicians
20th-century Italian politicians
Italian Ministers of Defence
Environment ministers of Italy
Mayors of Turin
Members of the Chamber of Deputies (Italy)
Members of the Senate of the Republic (Italy)
University of Turin alumni